The Phonies are a Finnish rock band formed in Ykspihlaja, Kokkola in 2002. The band's members are vocalist Tom Stenman, guitarist Risto Lehtomaa, and bassist Pekka Hietalahti. The Phonies is coupled around the songwriting partnership of Tom Stenman and Risto Lehtomaa, who have been working together since the late 1980s. In addition to The Phonies, Stenman and Lehtomaa are known from the late Finnish guitar pop band called The Refreshments, which released a few singles and one album during the 1990s. Indie critics highly acclaimed The Refreshments attracted international attention and they made mini tour with UK indie band Mega City Four. The Refreshments broke up during the recording sessions of their second album. After a few years of musical separation this characteristic songwriter duo reunited in the form of The Phonies. The band developed a more organic musical style as they drifted away from the sound of power pop, helping to develop the characteristic rock sound which drew its strength from the 70's psychedelia and musical influences such as The Bevis Frond, Roky Erickson and Kevin Ayers. Stenman's lyrics are known for being whimsical and somewhat cryptic. Stenman's soul-searching and intense vocals combined to Lehtomaa's sense of style and melody forms the core of The Phonies music.

Members

Discography

Albums

Singles

Compilations & Live Recordings
Drug Buddies: A Tribute To The Lemonheads (Double D Records, 2006)
The Power Pop Overthrow vol. 1 (272 Records, 2007)

References

External links 
 The Phonies official WWW page
 [ The Phonies in AllMusic]
 The Phonies official MySpace page
 The Phonies official Facebook page
 Double D Records
 Money Laundry Records

Finnish rock music groups
Finnish indie rock groups
Musical groups established in 2002